Henning High School was a public high school located in Henning, Illinois.

History
The town of Henning is located in eastern Illinois in central Vermilion County. U.S. Route 136 passes through Henning which sits west of Illinois Route 1. The C&EI Railroad (Chicago and Eastern Illinois) and the IC Railroad (Illinois Central) both had spurs that crossed in Henning.  The IC is no longer active; the C&EI spur ends in Henning for the purpose of serving the grain elevator still there. The Indiana / Illinois state line is just nine miles east of Henning. A town of note in the area includes Danville just 11 miles south and a little east of Henning.

It is known that Henning residents supported their own school system for many years.  The school, established probably in the late 19th century, flourished for about five decades. Subsequently, consolidation negotiations began with the neighboring town of Bismarck, Illinois, This brought about the Bismarck-Henning School District and the Bismarck Henning High School. The last mention of either Bismarck or Henning on the IHSA web site is Henning competing in the Speech Sweepstakes competition in 1946.  The earliest mention of the Bismarck-Henning Consolidated High School is 1960 for football.

Henning High School was purchased in 1999 by Full Fill Industries, LLC and is now home to their aerosol manufacturing plant.

Principals
1934-1937 Chester A. Rumble, B. S., ’16; A. M., ’20.
19??-1964  Clayton Wilcox      Lawrence H. Mumm  preceded Wilcox as principal (was so listed in 1940 yearbook)

Athletics
Henning High School definitely offered basketball as a sport. Baseball and track were two other sports for Henning athletes. The English Department at Henning had one great year when the tiny hamlet of Henning competed against much larger areas in Team and Individual Speech Competition. With an enrollment ( in 1943 under 100) less than 100 students, football was not offered.  Sports for females were not available in those days.

Boys Basketball
The only mention of the Henning High School boys basketball team is of the lone District Championship won by the boys of 1936–37.  No other team records or coaches names are listed.  If you have any of this information to share it would be deeply appreciated.

1936-37       District Champions

From the 1934 Henning High School Yearbook

1934 Henning High School Basketball team
P, Hamilton, Taylor, Tutwiler, McConnel, Robinet, Walters, Hudson, Allison, Berglund, Hamilton, Edington, Hickman, Beck, ANderson, Coach Hay, Mourer, Luttrell, Hanson, Ashwood.

The first game of the 1933–34 season was played on November 3 against Wellington.

Alumni
 Jacob Volkmann, 3x state champion wrestler; professional MMA fighter

References

Former high schools in Illinois
Schools in Vermilion County, Illinois
1914 establishments in Illinois